Nadja Kasanesh Holm, (born 10 October 1997) is a Swedish singer and winner of Idol 2020. She was born in Ethiopia and grew up in Roknäs outside of Piteå. On 27 November, 2020, she along with  Paulina Pancenkov made it to the final of the TV4 singing competition Idol 2020. Nadja Holm won the final.

In 2022, Holm played the leading role in the musical ”The bodyguard – The musical”, at Chinateatern in Stockholm.

Discography

Singles

References

Living people
Idol (Swedish TV series) participants
1997 births
Swedish pop singers
21st-century Swedish women singers
Idol (Swedish TV series) winners